The Winyaw River is a river in southern part of Myanmar. It originates in Tenasserim Range and empties into the Ataran River at the village of Chaunghanakwa. Death Railway crosses the river near Anankwin village.

See also
List of rivers of Myanmar

References

External links
 Winyaw River myanmar-law-library

Rivers of Myanmar